Great Haywood railway station is a disused railway station in Staffordshire, England.

The railway line between Stone and Colwich, England, was opened by the North Staffordshire Railway (NSR) in 1849 but a station to serve the village of Great Haywood was not opened until 1887.  Although the line was a busy route for the NSR for traffic to and from Birmingham and the south; the amount of local traffic carried was low and passenger services were never intensive.

Passenger services on the line were, as a wartime measure, reduced in 1941 to a single train per day from Stoke which had no corresponding return journey.   In 1947 all stopping passenger services between Stone and Colwich were withdrawn and Great Haywood along with the neighbouring station, closed.

References
Notes

Sources

Further reading

Disused railway stations in Staffordshire
Former North Staffordshire Railway stations
Railway stations in Great Britain closed in 1947
Railway stations in Great Britain opened in 1887